Argentina competed at the 2015 Pan American Games in Toronto, Ontario, Canada, from July 10 to 26, 2015. On June 1, 2015, track cyclist and former Olympic gold medalist Walter Pérez was named as the country's flagbearer during the opening ceremony.

Competitors
The following table lists Argentina's delegation per sport and gender.

Medalists

|align="left" valign="top"|

|align="left" valign="top"|

Archery

Argentina qualified two female archers based on its performance at the 2014 Pan American Championships. Later Argentina qualified 2 men and 1 more woman based on its performance at the 2015 Copa Merengue.

Men

Women

Athletics

Argentina qualified three athletes in three different disciplines.

Men

Field events

Women

Field events

Badminton

Argentina qualified a team of six athletes (three men and three women).

Men

Women

Mixed

Basketball

Argentina qualified a men's and a women's team. Each team consisted of 12 athletes, for a total of 24.

Men's tournament

Group B

Fifth place match

Women's tournament

Group B

Fifth place match

Beach volleyball 

Argentina qualified a men's and women's pair for a total of four athletes.

Bowling

Argentina qualified 4 players, two for the men's individual tournament and doubles and two for the women's individual tournament and doubles.

Singles

Pairs

Boxing

Argentina qualified 7 boxers, five for the men's events and two for the women's events.

Men

Women

Canoeing

Slalom
Argentina qualified the following boats:

Sprint
Argentina qualified 11 athletes in the sprint discipline (6 in men's kayak and 5 in women's kayak).

Men

Women

Qualification Legend: QF = Qualify to final; QS = Qualify to semifinal

Cycling

Argentina qualified a team of 21 athletes.

BMX
Men

Women

Mountain biking

Road cycling
Men

Women

Track cycling
Keirin

Sprint

Omnium

Team pursuit and sprint

Equestrian

Argentina qualified a team of 12 athletes.

Dressage
Argentina qualified a full dressage team.

Eventing
Argentina qualified a full eventing team.

Jumping
Argentina qualified a full jumping team.

Individual

Team

Fencing

Argentina qualified 14 fencers (7 men, 7 women).

Men

Women

Field hockey

Argentina qualified both a men's and women's teams for a total of 32 athletes (16 men and 16 women).

Men's tournament

Pool A

Quarterfinal

Semifinal

Gold medal Match

Women's tournament

Pool A

Quarterfinal

Semifinal

Gold medal Match

Football

Argentina qualified a women's team of 18 athletes.

Women's tournament

Head coach: 

Group A

Golf

Argentina qualified four athletes.

Gymnastics

Argentina qualified eleven gymnasts.

Artistic
Men
Team Final & Individual Qualification
Argentina qualified three male artistic gymnasts.

Individual Finals

Women
Team Finals & Individual Qualification
Argentina qualified a full women's artistic team of five gymnasts.

Individual Finals

Rhythmic
Argentina qualified two athletes.

Individual

Qualification Legend: Q = Qualified to apparatus final

Trampoline
Argentina qualified two trampoline gymnasts.

Handball

Argentina qualified a men's and a women's team. Each team consisted of 15 athletes, for a total of 30.

Men's tournament

Group B

Semifinal

Gold medal Match

Women's tournament

Group B

Semifinal

Gold medal Match

Judo

Argentina qualified a team of eleven judokas.

Men

Women

Karate

Argentina qualified 5 athletes.

Modern pentathlon

Argentina qualified a team of 4 athletes (2 men and 2 women).

Men

Women

Racquetball

Argentina qualified a team of two men and two women for a total of four athletes.

Men

Women

Roller sports

Argentina qualified a team of 6 athletes (one man and woman for the figure skating events, and two men and two women for the speed skating events).

Figure skating

Speed skating

Men

Women

Rowing

Argentina qualified 13 boats.

Men

Women

Qualification Legend: FA=Final A (medal); FB=Final B (non-medal); R=Repechage

Rugby sevens

Argentina qualified a men's and women's teams for a total of 24 athletes (12 men and 12 women).

Men's tournament

Group B

Quarterfinals

Semifinals

Gold medal Match

Women's tournament

Preliminary Stage

Bronze medal Match

Sailing

Argentina qualified 9 boats.

Men

Women

Open

Shooting

Argentina qualified a team of 15 athletes (10 competed in the men's events and 5 in the women's events).

Men

Women

Softball

Argentina qualified a men's team of 15 athletes.

Men's tournament

Group A

Semifinal

Bronze medal Match

Squash

Argentina qualified 6 athletes (3 men and 3 women).

Men

Women

Swimming

Argentina qualified 13 male swimmers and 7 female swimmers, and an additional four swimmers (two per gender) in the open water events.

Men

Women

Synchronized swimming

Argentina qualified a full team of nine athletes.

Table tennis

Argentina qualified a men's and women's team.

Men

Women

Taekwondo

Argentina qualified a team of five athletes (three men and two women).

Men

Women

Tennis

Argentina qualified 4 tennis players (2 men and 2 women).

Singles

Doubles

Triathlon

Argentina qualified 6 athletes (3 men and 3 women).

Volleyball 

Argentina qualified a men's and women's volleyball team, for a total of 24 athletes (12 men and 12 women).
Men's tournament

 Group A

Quarterfinal

Semifinal

Gold medal Match

Women's tournament

 Group A

Quarterfinal

Fifth place match

Water polo

Argentina qualified a men's and a women's team. Each team consisted of 13 athletes, for a total of 26.

Men's tournament

Group A

Semifinal

Bronze medal Match

Women's tournament

Group A

Classification 5–8

Seventh place match

Water skiing

Argentina qualified 5 athletes (4 men and 1 woman).

Men

Women

Overall

Weightlifting

Argentina qualified a team of 2 athletes (1 man and 1 woman).

Wrestling

Argentina qualified five male wrestlers and one female wrestler. Luz Vázquez was disqualified from the games for doping.

Men
Freestyle

Greco-Roman

Women

Freestyle

See also
Argentina at the 2015 Parapan American Games
Argentina at the 2016 Summer Olympics

References

Nations at the 2015 Pan American Games
Pan American Games
2015